Maiden Paps, Maidens Paps or Maiden's Pap may refer to:
Maidens Paps, a cairn near Cochno Loch in the Kilpatrick Hills, Scotland
Maiden Paps, Hawick, twin hills south of Hawick in the Scottish Borders, Scotland
Tunstall Hills, Sunderland, Tyne and Wear, England
Maiden Pap, Caithness, a hill in Caithness, Scotland
Schiehallion, Perth and Kinross, Scotland

See also
 Paps of Anu
 Pap of Glencoe  
 Paps of Jura
 Breast-shaped hill